Ain Hawr or Ain Hur (Arabic: عين حور) is a Syrian village in the Al-Zabadani District of the Rif Dimashq Governorate. According to the Syria Central Bureau of Statistics (CBS), Ain Hawr had a population of 1,974 in the 2004 census. Its inhabitants are predominantly Sunni Muslims.

References

Bibliography 

 

Populated places in Al-Zabadani District